Michael W. Morrissey (born August 2, 1954) is the District Attorney of Norfolk County, Massachusetts (2011–present). He previously served as a State Senator for the Norfolk and Plymouth district (1993–2011) and a State Representative for the 1st Norfolk and 3rd Norfolk districts (1977–1993). He is a Democrat and resides in North Quincy, a neighborhood of Quincy, Massachusetts.

Biography
Morrissey was born in Quincy, Massachusetts, on August 2, 1954. He attended public schools in Quincy. He received a B.A. from the University of Massachusetts Amherst and an M.P.A. from Western New England College. He graduated from Suffolk University Law School in 1985 with a J.D. He was elected to the Massachusetts House of Representatives, where he represented the 3rd Norfolk district from 1977 to 1979 and the 1st Norfolk district from 1979 to 1993. He was then elected to the Massachusetts Senate, where he represented the Norfolk and Plymouth district from 1993 to 2011.

Morrissey's full term as District Attorney started on January 5, 2011. He was sworn in early on January 2 to succeed William R. Keating, who resigned to take a seat in the United States House of Representatives.

Electoral History

}}

}}

}}

References

External links
Official Website of Michael W. Morrissey DA of Norfolk County

District attorneys in Norfolk County, Massachusetts
Democratic Party Massachusetts state senators
Politicians from Quincy, Massachusetts
Living people
1954 births
University of Massachusetts Amherst alumni
Western New England University alumni